Ho Bong-hak was a military officer and politician of the Democratic People's Republic of Korea (North Korea). He served as a commander of the People's Army during the Korean War and later was a member of the Central Committee of the Workers' Party of Korea as well as member of the Supreme People's Assembly, North Korea's unilateral parliament.

Biography

During the Korean War, he served as a commander in the Korean People's Army, and in 1951 as the Commander of the 4th Corps. In 1958 he was promoted to Lieutenant General of the People's Army and served as President of the Korean People's Army Military University. In 1959, he passed through the commander of the People's Army's II Corps, and in 1960, emerged as the National Security Agency, and then was promoted to the People's Army, becoming the Director of the General Political Bureau of the People's Army.

After that, he served as secretary of the secretariat of the Central Committee of the Workers' Party of Korea, a member of the Standing Committee of the Supreme People's Assembly, and a secretary of the Central Committee of the Workers' Party of Korea. Since 1962, he has been elected to the 3rd and 4th convocations of the Supreme People's Assembly. He was suddenly purged in March 1969.

References

Workers' Party of Korea politicians
North Korean generals
North Korean military personnel of the Korean War
Members of the Supreme People's Assembly
People from North Hamgyong
Purges in North Korea
People of 88th Separate Rifle Brigade